Zhu Zhengrong (Chinese: 朱峥嵘; Pinyin: Zhū Zhēngróng ; born 11 October 1988) is a Chinese footballer who currently plays as a  forward or winger for Kunshan FC.

Club career
Zhu Zhengrong joined the Genbao Football Academy in 2000. He left the academy to join China League Two club Shanghai Wicrrun in May 2004 and returned to academy in December 2005. He was promoted to Shanghai East Asia's first team for the 2006 season. Zhu played as a regular starter at the striker position and scored nine goals as Shanghai was promoted to the second tier in the 2007 season. On 29 September 2012, Zhu scored a goal for Shanghai in a 3-0 win against Harbin Yiteng which was enough to secure the club promotion to the top flight.

On 18 November 2014 Shanghai would be taken over by Shanghai International Port Group who immediately invested significantly in player recruitment to push for the league title. They would bring in Ghanaian international forward Asamoah Gyan in the 2015 Chinese Super League. This resulted in significantly less playing time for Zhu and on 22 June 2016 he was loaned to China League One side Meizhou Hakka until 31 December 2016.
In March 2017, Zhu was loaned to League Two side Suzhou Dongwu until 31 December 2017.
In March 2018, Zhu was loaned to Nantong Zhiyun until 31 December 2018.

On 2 March 2019, Zhu transferred to China League Two side Kunshan FC. He would be part of the team that gained promotion to the second tier at the end of the 2019 China League Two campaign. He would go on to establish himself as regular within the team and was part of the squad that won the division and promotion to the top tier at the end of the 2022 China League One campaign.

Career statistics 
Statistics accurate as of match played 25 December 2022.

Honours

Club
Shanghai SIPG
 China League One: 2012
 China League Two: 2007

Kunshan
 China League One: 2022

References

External links

1988 births
Living people
Chinese footballers
Footballers from Shanghai
Shanghai Port F.C. players
Meizhou Hakka F.C. players
Nantong Zhiyun F.C. players
Kunshan F.C. players
Chinese Super League players
China League One players
China League Two players
Association football forwards